James or Jim Barnett may refer to:

Politicians
Jim Barnett (Kansas politician) (born 1955), American politician
Jim Barnett (Mississippi politician) (1926–2013), American physician and politician
James Barnett (MP) ( 1760–1836), English politician, MP for Rochester
James Barnett (New York politician) (1810–1874), New York politician in Madison County, New York
James R. Barnett (1842–1917), Wisconsin politician

Others
James Barnett (entrepreneur) (born 1986), American entrepreneur and community activist
James V. Barnett II, American engineer
James Rennie Barnett (1864–1965), Scottish naval architect
Jim Barnett (basketball) (born 1944), American basketball player and commentator
Jim Barnett (wrestling) (1924–2004), American professional wrestling promoter
James Barnett (writer), American television writer and the co-creator of the television show F Troop

See also
James Barnet (1827–1904), Australian architect